Taluga may refer to:

 Taluga (country), proposed micro-nation on the Cortes Bank
 USS Taluga (AO-62), American Navy oiler ship